Phyllonorycter caspica is a moth of the family Gracillariidae. It is known from Azerbaijan.

References

caspica
Moths described in 1992
Endemic fauna of Azerbaijan
Moths of Asia